Gottfrid Lindgren (13 September 1892 – 18 December 1975) was a Swedish wrestler. He competed in the freestyle middleweight event at the 1920 Summer Olympics.

References

External links
 

1892 births
1975 deaths
Olympic wrestlers of Sweden
Wrestlers at the 1920 Summer Olympics
Swedish male sport wrestlers
Sportspeople from Malmö